Noah Fatar (born 15 February 2002) is a French professional footballer who plays as a forward for  club Cholet on loan from Angers.

Club career 
Noah Fatar came through the ranks of Lille, first impressing in the UEFA Youth League, where he scored against Chelsea and Valencia, helping his team win on both occasions.

But Fatar eventually signed his first professional contract with Angers SCO, after refusing an offer from Everton, starting the 2020–21 season with Angers B team in National 2.

Noah Fatar made his debut with the first team on the 7 March 2021, coming on as a substitute and scoring in Angers 5-0 Coupe de France win against the Club Franciscain.

He made his Ligue 1 debut with Angers on the 4 April 2021, coming on as a substitute in the 1–1 home draw against Montpellier HSC.

On 4 August 2022, Fatar joined Cholet in Championnat National on a season-long loan.

Personal life
Born in France, Fatar is of Moroccan descent.

References

External links

FFF Profile

2002 births
French sportspeople of Moroccan descent
People from L'Isle-Adam, Val-d'Oise
Footballers from Val-d'Oise
Living people
French footballers
Association football forwards
Angers SCO players
SO Cholet players
Ligue 1 players
Championnat National 2 players
Championnat National players